Canalete is a town and municipality located in the Córdoba Department, northern Colombia.

References
 Gobernacion de Cordoba - Canalete
 Canalete official website

region pujante de Colombia

Cordoba